William Hutchinson (13 October 1913 – 1 June 1994) was an English professional rugby league footballer who played in the 1930s and 1940s.

Background 
Billy Hutchinson was born in Bradford, West Riding of Yorkshire, England, and he died aged 80 in Bradford, West Yorkshire, England.

Playing career

International honours 
Billy Hutchinson won 2 caps for England while at Bradford Northern, he made his international début, and played left-, i.e. number 11, in the 9-9 draw with Wales at Central Park, Wigan on Saturday 26 February 1944, and played  in the 18-8 victory over Wales at Central Park, Wigan on Saturday 10 March 1945.

Club career 
Billy Hutchinson made his début for Featherstone Rovers on Saturday 10 February 1945.

References 

1913 births
1994 deaths
Bradford Bulls players
England national rugby league team players
English rugby league players
Featherstone Rovers players
Rugby league fullbacks
Rugby league locks
Rugby league props
Rugby league second-rows
Rugby league utility players
Rugby league players from Bradford